Shannon Lundgren is an American politician who sits in the Iowa House of Representatives.

Early life 
On April 4, 1972, Lundgren was born in Dubuque, Iowa.

Education 
Lundgren attended Midwest Travel & Hospitality Institute and became a certified travel agent.

Career 
Lundgren's career started in the travel industry. From 1996 to 2001, Lundgren was a sales manager of Eagle Ridge Inn and Resort.
Since 2006, Lundgren is the co-owner of Trackside Bar & Grill.

Lundgren is a member of the Iowa Republican Party.
In 2018, Lundgren's political career began when she won the election to become a Representative in the Iowa State House of Representative. Lundgren represents district 57.

Personal life 
Lundgren's husband is Charlie. They have two children. Lundgrens and her family resides in Peosta, Iowa.

References

1972 births
Living people
Republican Party members of the Iowa House of Representatives
Women state legislators in Iowa
21st-century American politicians
21st-century American women politicians
American hospitality businesspeople